Mundŏk station is a railway station in Mundŏk-ŭp, Mundŏk County, South P'yŏngan Province, North Korea. . It is the junction point of the P'yŏngŭi and Sŏhae lines of the Korean State Railway..

History
The station was opened, together with the rest of this section of the Kyŏngŭi Line, on 5 November 1905. Originally called Mansŏng station, it was given its current name in July 1945.

References

Railway stations in North Korea